Mannarghat Muppil Nair (Kunnattattil Madambil Nair) was the royal title usually given to the eldest male member of Mannarghat Muppil Nair family. He was a "desavazhi" (provincial governor) under Valluvanad (southern Malabar, India), looking after the eastern boundary and the hilly areas. The Nairs had considerable land holdings in the area and also held about 70% of the land in Attappadi, including Silent Valley.

See also
Muppil Nayar

References

History of the Nair
Feudal states of Kerala
History of Malappuram district